Labeobarbus lufupensis is a species of ray-finned fish in the genus Labeobarbus which is endemic to the Lufupa River in the Democratic Republic of the Congo.

References 

 

lufupensis
Taxa named by Keith Edward Banister
Taxa named by Roland G. Bailey
Fish described in 1979
Endemic fauna of the Democratic Republic of the Congo